Pascale Petit (born Anne-Marie Pettit; 27 February 1938) is a French actress. She appeared in more than fifty films from 1957 to 2001.

Biography
Working as a hairdresser, she entered films when her beauty was noticed by actress Françoise Lugagne whose husband Raymond Rouleau was searching for young actresses for his directorial debut The Crucible (1957).  Petit played the role of Mary Warren.

The following year she was awarded the Prix Suzanne Bianchetti in 1958 for her role as Rosalie in One Life (1958).  During the 1960s Petit appeared as the female lead in several European international co-productions such as portraying Cleopatra in the 1962 film A Queen for Caesar.  Petit appeared opposite Roger Moore, Ray Danton, Jeffrey Hunter, Guy Madison and Curd Jurgens.  In the 1970s and 1980s she performed a variety of roles on French Television.

Selected filmography

References

External links
 

1938 births
Living people
French film actresses
Actresses from Paris